The 34th GLAAD Media Awards is the 2023 annual presentation of the GLAAD Media Awards, presented by GLAAD honoring the 2022 media season. They will be held on March 30, 2023 in Los Angeles and on May 13, 2023 in New York City. The awards honor films, television shows, video games, musicians and works of journalism that fairly, accurately and inclusively represent the LGBT community and issues relevant to the community.

Category changes
For the 34th ceremony, GLAAD announced the introduction of two new categories: Outstanding Podcast and Outstanding Live TV Journalism - Segment or Special. They also revealed changes to the Outstanding Reality Program category, which was split into Outstanding Reality Program and Outstanding Reality Program - Competition, and the Outstanding Kids and Family Programming category, which was split into Live Action and Animated categories. In addition, the Outstanding Film – Wide Release category featured ten nominees for the first time and separate category for streaming films and TV movies was introduced.

Winners and nominees
The eligibility period for the 34th GLAAD Media Awards ran from January 1, 2022 to December 31, 2022. The nominees were announced on January 18, 2023 by RuPaul's Drag Race stars Sasha Colby and Salina EsTittes on the GLAAD YouTube channel.

Film

Television

Children's Programming

Other

Journalism

Spanish Language

Special Recognition

Barbara Gittings Award for Excellence in LGBTQ Media: The Los Angeles Blade and The Washington Blade

References

GLAAD Media Awards ceremonies
GLAAD
2023 in LGBT history